Natasha Irons is a fictional superhero in DC Comics. She first appeared in Steel (vol. 2) #1 (February 1994). She becomes the fifth superhero to use the name Steel when her uncle John Henry Irons is injured. In the 2006 limited series 52, Natasha gains superpowers and uses the codename Starlight. When her powers change, allowing her to become a being of living mist she assumes the codename Vaporlock.

Tayler Buck portrays the character in the television series Superman & Lois.

Fictional character biography
Natasha Irons is the daughter of John Henry's brother, Clay, and Clay's wife Blondel. She is introduced in the first issue of Steel's solo series, where she is initially portrayed as being 13. Like the rest of her family, she knew about Steel's secret identity all along. Contrasting sharply with her brother Jemahl, Natasha is shown to be very level headed and practical. By issue #14, she is shown to be working (presumably as an intern) for a U.S. Senator. She appears to have aged forward to be about 16 somehow. Nat is a supporting character throughout Louise Simonson's run on the series. She is kidnapped by Hazard and Steel has to rescue her. She also uses the drug Tar to help fight at her uncle's side briefly. She is later kidnapped by the villain Plasmus and apparently kills him by shattering once Steel froze the villain (although he later turns up alive). Natasha was devastated at the loss of her beloved great-grandmother, Bess Irons, but is the only one of her family who stays with Steel when he moves to Jersey City (see the Steel entry for more details of the Irons family).

With Christopher Priest at the helm of Steel starting with #34, Nat was radically altered. She was transformed into a more stereotypical modern teenager with a flippant attitude. All trace of her previous work for a U.S. Senator was never referenced. During this time she also meets and befriends a teen named Paul, whom she dubs "Boris". Her father also makes a return as the villain Crash. When an assassin named Skorpio poisons Nat, Crash has to turn himself in so that he can give a blood transfusion and save his daughter. He is never seen nor heard from again.

Nat later goes with Steel to Metropolis when he opens up Steelworks there. She becomes his assistant, even reprogramming Superman's Kryptonian robot Kelex to speak hip hop slang. For a time she is dating a local boy, Boris.

The new Steel

When the Entropy Aegis of Darkseid traps John, Natasha designs a suit of armor that uses the Aegis' power, teleports to Apokolips, and fights Doomsday with the help of Superman, Superboy, Supergirl, and the pre-Crisis Supergirl.

John is too injured to continue operating as Steel. Having intended to pass his legacy as Steel on to Natasha, John made a new, more advanced suit of armor for her to use.

When Natasha hears that Superman has been injured by a ghostly ninja, she dons her armor and becomes the new Steel. She teams up with Cir-El and Girl 13 to stop the ninja. During the adventure, she uses her hammer to fire an electric pulse into Superman's heart to start it again.

As part of the Superman/Batman "Public Enemies" arc, false news of Batman and Superman's capture by the forces of President Lex Luthor is leaked to draw out their various associates into attacking the White House. Cir-El, Natasha, Krypto, Superboy and the Batman Family do exactly that. Natasha is neutralized early in the incident, staying back to try to rescue Cir-El and Superboy from a crushing deathtrap. Instead, Batman saves them.

Natasha is briefly seen in a cameo role during the events of "Infinite Crisis".

Starlight

In 52, Natasha has a violent falling out with her uncle John, over John's disgust over what he feels is the self-absorbed narcissism of the DC Universe's superhero community. When Natasha discovers that the Teen Titans (whose roster was devastated by the events of Infinite Crisis) are holding an open call for new members, John forbids Natasha from going and instead insists she continue the clearing out debris from the battle of Metropolis. When Natasha refuses, John dismantles her armor, and she is left powerless. John also makes it clear that she will have to build her own armor if she wants to be a super-hero.

Soon, Natasha attempts to rebuild her armor, with little success. When she learns that John had his DNA rewritten by the exo-gene, Natasha wrongly assumes John chose to have his DNA altered and snaps.

After a fierce argument with her uncle, Natasha applies for Luthor's "Everyman Project" and becomes one of the first official subjects. When John, looking for Natasha, threatens to kill Luthor at a Lexcorp party, Natasha appears, along with a team of super-powered people in Luthor's employ, and beats him severely. From that point, she is estranged from her uncle, who makes numerous attempts to contact her, which she rebuffs. Gifted with new skills, Natasha is given the codename Starlight. While in battle, she witnesses her friend Eliza Harmon (a.k.a. Trajectory) killed by a new Blockbuster. Natasha is finally contacted by John on New Year's Eve, who forces her to rethink everything that Luthor has told her. After the "Rain of the Supermen," in which Lex Luthor deactivates the powers of each Everyman hero outside of Infinity, Inc. (causing many to plummet from the sky; this forms the basis of the title pun on "The Reign of the Supermen" storyline), Natasha realizes that her uncle was right all along. She then begins working as a double agent within Luthor's organization. However, she is found out and beaten by Luthor, who has acquired superpowers.

Steel and the Teen Titans launch an attack on LexCorp and manage to rescue Natasha. However, Lex stripped her of her Starlight powers. Later, she is seen escorting Luthor into custody, wearing a new set of armour made for her by her uncle. The duo restore Steelworks, and Natasha is later seen, during the World War III assembling a nanotech payload missile to fire over Black Adam, although the missile is stolen by Booster Gold. Natasha survives the battle, and resumes working at Steelworks.

Vaporlock 

The new Infinity, Inc. series reveals that the Everyman Project has had a lingering effect on its subjects. Natasha now has the ability to dissolve into a cloud of gas, although she has difficulty controlling it. Her uncle suggests she adopt the codename "Vaporlock." In the final issue, of the series all the Infinity Inc members are prisoners in the Dark Side Club. By the end of the Terror Titans miniseries they are released thanks to Miss Martian.

"Jenny" Blake and Project 7734 
After being released from the Dark Side Club, the members of Infinity Inc. take new names and infiltrate a government project named Project 7734. The goal of the project is simple: the death of Superman. Towards that end, the government project has placed satellites in space that fire magic lasers, plucked the powerful Atlas from the time stream, release Metallo, and brainwashed people.

Natasha is not sure whom to trust as part of Project: Breach (the brainwashing of Captain Atom). She visits Earth to tell Jimmy Olsen, who has been looking into Project 7734, about Captain Atom and leaves just before Jimmy is found and shot by Codename: Assassin. In the Captain Atom back-up story in Action Comics, Captain Atom remembers who he is, revealing his real name and rank along with the "Codename: Captain Atom". Joining others of Project 7734 (such as Codename: Superwoman and Codename: Metallo), Natasha is part of the team that takes down Captain Atom to brainwash him before they are attacked by the natives of the magical world where Project 7734 is located. The natives want her to help them with Captain Atom.

Following this, Natasha is shown helping Steel rescue civilians during the Reign of Doomsday event. Doomsday attacks Natasha in order to draw Steel's attention, and though she escapes unscathed, Steel is ultimately beaten into submission and captured.

DC Rebirth
In the "DC Rebirth," continuity, Natasha is back to using her armor and no longer has any of her Vaporlock abilities. Here she was in a romantic relationship with Traci 13, but they broke up  (though it's not confirmed whether she's a lesbian or bisexual). Following the No Justice event, she becomes a member of the new incarnation of the Titans.

Powers and abilities

Exo-gene
As Starlight, Natasha is able to fly, exert superhuman strength, and is more durable. Her fists also emit large flashes of light. She also can focus her light into forcefields, and trap her opponents within them, such as when she encased Blockbuster in a light energy field to prevent him from moving.
As Vaporlock, Natasha has the ability to transform her body into a gaseous substance.

Armor
Natasha's "Steel" armor boosts her strength to super-human levels, and rockets in her boots allow her to fly. The armor can grow to heights of up to 60 feet, and it is equipped with limited-technomorphing abilities able to shift energy guns and projectile weaponry from its liquid-metal.
Natasha's main weapon is her hammer, which has inertial dampeners that cause the hammer's force to increase exponentially (the farther it is thrown, the harder it hits). The hammer can fire electromagnetic pulses and generate powerful electric and magnetic fields at Natasha's command. When the hammer is placed on the ground, it connects with the Earth's magnetic field and cannot be moved except by Natasha or someone with similar DNA, such as her uncle John Henry Irons.
The original, Entropy-Aegis-fueled armor endowed her with enhanced strength and teleportation, and enabled her to fire blasts of strange, purple energy from her hands.

Other versions

Kingdom Come
Natasha Irons / Steel appears as a background character in Kingdom Come.

Flashpoint
An alternate timeline version of Natasha Irons appears in Flashpoint as a member of the Brazilian Army who fights Nazis.

Ame-Comi
An anime-inspired Natasha Irons / Steel with superhuman intelligence appears in the Ame-Comi series. After recruiting the Flash, the three young heroines set out to face down Dent.

Superman Family Adventures
A teenage version of Natasha Irons appears in Superman Family Adventures as a friend and classmate of Jimmy Olsen.

Multiversity
An adult version of Natasha Irons / Steel appears in Multiversity as a member of the Justice League of Earth-16.

In other media

Television
 Natasha Irons appears in television series set in the DC Animated Universe (DCAU).
 She first appears in the Superman: The Animated Series episode "Heavy Metal", voiced by Cree Summer.
 Irons also makes a cameo appearance in the Justice League episode "Hereafter".
 A character based on Natasha Irons named Natalie appears in Superman & Lois, portrayed by Tayler Buck. This version is the daughter of John Henry Irons and Lois Lane from a parallel Earth ruled by Morgan Edge, Superman, and an army of genetically-engineered Kryptonians. After Superman killed Lane, Natalie helped her father build an exo-suit so he could avenge Lane. At the end of the first season, Natalie unknowingly makes her way to the "prime" Earth in a spaceship and reunites with her father. In the second season, Irons and the "prime" Lane help Natalie adjust to the new Earth. In response to Ally Allston's attempts to merge Earth with Bizarro World, Natalie constructs an exo-suit with X-Kryptonite lacquer for her father.

Miscellaneous
 Natasha Irons appears in issue #35 of the Justice League Unlimited tie-in comic, in which she wears a costume similar to her Steel armor in the mainstream comics.
 Natasha Irons / Steel appears in the Injustice 2 prequel comic. This version took up the mantle of Steel after John Henry Irons was killed by the Joker years prior when the latter nuked Metropolis. Additionally, she maintains John's use of the s-shield because she views it as his symbol, not Superman's. Following the Regime's downfall, Natasha helps Batman's Insurgency restore world peace.

References

African-American superheroes
DC Comics metahumans
DC Comics characters who are shapeshifters
DC Comics characters with superhuman strength
DC Comics female superheroes
DC Comics LGBT superheroes
Fictional characters with energy-manipulation abilities 
Fictional characters who can change size
Fictional characters who can manipulate light
Fictional hammer fighters
Steel (John Henry Irons)
Comics characters introduced in 1994
Characters created by Louise Simonson
Superman characters